Marks Creek Township (also designated Township 10) is one of twenty townships within Wake County, North Carolina, United States. As of the 2010 census, Marks Creek Township had a population of 21,932, a 34.7% increase over 2000.

Marks Creek Township, occupying  in eastern Wake County, includes the entire town of Wendell.

References

Townships in Wake County, North Carolina
Townships in North Carolina